Summerlin is a master-planned community in the Las Vegas Valley of Southern Nevada. It lies at the edge of the Spring Mountains and Red Rock Canyon to the west; it is partly within the official city limits of Las Vegas and partly within unincorporated Clark County. This rapidly growing community occupies over 22,500 acres and according to its developers, "has grown to encompass more than 230 parks, more than two dozen public and private schools, 14 houses of worship, nine golf courses, three resort hotels, recreational facilities, retail and entertainment centers, well-established office parks, a medical center, and more."

The community is divided into three associations (North, South, and West), which oversee two dozen commercial and residential villages.

At the time of the 2010 census, Summerlin's population was nearly 100,000, having risen from 59,000 residents in the year 2000.

Summerlin was named after Jean Amelia Summerlin, the grandmother of billionaire land-developer Howard Hughes. The Howard Hughes Corporation maintains ownership of the master-planned community, along with Downtown Summerlin (the community's premier shopping, dining, and entertainment district) and the Las Vegas Ballpark (home of the Las Vegas Aviators minor league baseball team, which is named in Hughes' honor).

History
In 1952, the film director, aviator, and casino mogul Howard Hughes purchased  of land in Southern Nevada, making him the Las Vegas Valley's largest landowner. Despite his initial intentions, he ultimately chose not to relocate his company to Nevada, so the purchased land remained undeveloped and empty for decades. After Hughes died of kidney failure in 1976, the Summa Corporation was organized by his heirs to oversee his vast business empire and land holdings. In 1988, the corporation announced that they would be developing the empty acres of land into a master-planned commercial and residential community. They named the project "Summerlin", after Hughes' paternal grandmother, Jean Amelia Summerlin.

In preparation for this large-scale development, Summa Corporation made a deal with the Bureau of Land Management, in which they traded 5000 acres of environmentally sensitive land for 3000 acres of land better suited for development. After this environmental concern was addressed, development began. By the end of 1990, the construction of Summerlin's first residential village, park, and school had been completed. In 1994, Summa Corporation rebranded itself as the Howard Hughes Corporation and continued to develop new Summerlin villages.

New home construction continued to boom through the turn of the century. From 1997 to 2007, Summerlin was consistently ranked as the #1 community in the nation for new home sales. The Great Recession caused a temporary slow-down in construction, but signs of revival became especially apparent in 2014, when Downtown Summerlin opened, bringing 106 acres of shopping, dining, and entertainment to Summerlin residents. Residential development also saw a great revival following the recession, and by 2016, Summerlin was once again one of the top communities in America for new home sales.

Summerlin is still a growing community. As of 2018, over two dozen commercial and residential villages have been constructed, with over 6,000 acres still available for future development.

Geography

Climate

Summerlin has a hot desert climate typical of the Mojave Desert in which it lies (Köppen climate classification: BWh).

Summers tend to be very hot and very dry, with daily highs often exceeding ; temperatures as high as 118 degrees have been observed. The spring and fall seasons are generally sunny, warm, and dry, with daily highs in the 70s and 80s. Winters tend to be cool and windy, with daily highs in the 50s; temperatures seldom drop below freezing, and snowfall is rare, but some rain is common (especially in January and February).

Economy
Allegiant Air has its corporate headquarters in Summerlin.

Hotel and casinos
The Summerlin area is home to three large resort casinos. 

JW Marriott Las Vegas Resort & Spa
Red Rock Casino, Resort & Spa
Suncoast Hotel and Casino 

Summerlin is also home to the Element Las Vegas (a Westin Hotel).

Arts and culture

Downtown Summerlin

Downtown Summerlin is the community's shopping, dining, and entertainment district. It hosts over 125 shops, bars, and restaurants. It is also home to the Las Vegas Ballpark (home of the Las Vegas Aviators minor league baseball team), and the City National Arena (practice facility for the Vegas Golden Knights NHL franchise and home arena of the UNLV Rebels hockey program).

Local events are held in Downtown Summerlin throughout the year. Popular events include outdoor fitness classes, wine walks, holiday festivals, and visits from celebrity guest speakers.

Library
Summerlin has a public library, a branch of the Las Vegas-Clark County Library District.

Sports
The city's NHL franchise, the Vegas Golden Knights, practice at City National Arena in Summerlin. The arena also offers skating lessons, hosts youth and adult amateur hockey leagues, and trains competitive figure skaters.

The UNLV Hockey team plays its home games at City National Arena in Summerlin.

The Las Vegas Aviators (a minor league baseball franchise) play at the Las Vegas Ballpark in Summerlin.

Parks and recreation

Cycling
Bicycle lanes are provided on most major roads in Summerlin, as well as in the adjacent Red Rock Canyon National Conservation Area.

Community parks
Large community parks, which are available for free public use, are located throughout Summerlin. , there are 25 community parks that feature a variety of recreational amenities, which may include: community centers, barbecue areas, walking trails, playgrounds, swimming pools, interactive water features, soccer fields, baseball fields, football fields, basketball courts, tennis courts, volleyball courts, bocce ball and shuffleboard courts, and motorized toy areas. In addition, the parks with community centers typically offer special events, classes, and children's camps.

Walking trails
As of 2018, the Summerlin Trail System is more than 150 miles long and connects local neighborhoods to various amenities throughout the community. The system includes five types of planned trails: street-side, village, bike, regional, and natural.

Upon completion, the trail system will be more than 200 miles long and will connect to more than 2,000 miles of regional trails, making it one of the most comprehensive and efficient trail systems in the southwestern United States.

In 2008, Summerlin and the Howard Hughes Corporation received the American Trails Developer Award, which is given to developers in recognition of "quality, well designed multi-use trails systems that are integrated into private developments."

Mountain recreation
The adjacent Red Rock Canyon National Conservation Area offers 26 hiking trails (ranging in difficulty from easy to strenuous). The canyon is also suitable for bouldering and rock climbing and has an overnight camp site.

Government

Summerlin lies partially within an incorporated municipality and partially within an unincorporated area. It is patrolled by the Las Vegas Metropolitan Police Department - Summerlin Area Command.
 
The area north of Charleston Boulevard is within the city of Las Vegas, while the area south of Charleston Boulevard is located in unincorporated Clark County. As a planned community, Summerlin is managed by three master associations (Summerlin North, Summerlin South, and Summerlin West). Summerlin is further developed into commercial and residential villages. Many individual subdivisions also have their own homeowners associations.

Summerlin has three age-restricted communities for senior citizens (Sun City Summerlin, The Regency, and Siena).

Education

Public schools
Public schools in Summerlin belong to the Clark County School District, which serves almost all of Southern Nevada.

Elementary schools located in Summerlin
Shelley Berkley Elementary School
John W. Bonner Elementary School
Roger M. Bryan Elementary School
Linda Rankin Givens Elementary School
John & Judy Goolsby Elementary School
William R. Lummis Elementary School
D’vorre & Hal Ober Elementary School
Ethel W. Staton Elementary School
James B. McMillan Elementary
Katz Elementary

Middle schools located in Summerlin
Ernest Becker Middle School
Victoria Fertitta Middle School
Sig Rogich Middle School

High schools located in Summerlin
Palo Verde High School
Cimarron-Memorial High School
West Career And Technical Academy (magnet school)

In addition to the above-listed public schools, some Summerlin residents may be zoned for schools located just outside of the Summerlin boundaries (many families in Summerlin South, for example, are zoned for Durango High School in nearby Spring Valley).

Private schools
Summerlin is also home to several private schools, including:

The Adelson Educational Campus (K-12; Jewish)
Alexander Dawson School (K-8; Secular)
Bishop Gorman High School (9-12; Catholic)
Faith Lutheran Academy (K-5; Lutheran)
Faith Lutheran Jr/Sr High School (6-12; Lutheran)
The Meadows School (K-12; Secular)
Merryhill School (K-5; Secular)
St. Elizabeth Ann Seton Catholic School (K-8; Catholic)
The Shenker Academy (Kindergarten only; Jewish)
Sholom Schechter Day School of Las Vegas (K-5; Jewish)

Higher education
Higher education within the community of Summerlin is mostly limited to small satellite campuses, including:

The College of Southern Nevada (Summerlin Center Campus; Public)
The Roseman University of Health Sciences (Summerlin Campus; Private)

However, Summerlin is also located within 10 miles of the College of Southern Nevada's main campus (CSN - Charleston), within 20 miles of the University of Nevada, Las Vegas (UNLV), and within 30 miles of Nevada State College (NSC).

Infrastructure

Healthcare
The Summerlin Hospital Medical Center, a private hospital operated by the Valley Health System, provides 485 beds to the local community. It is an accredited Chest Pain Center and Primary Stroke Center. Other features include: the Children's Medical Center, the Breast Care Center, the Cancer Center, the Rehab Center, and the Robotic Surgery Center. Its 40-acre campus is located in The Crossings village of Summerlin North.

Notable people

Sheldon Adelson: Chairman and CEO of Las Vegas Sands
Andre Agassi and Steffi Graf: Retired professional tennis players
Eugenie Bouchard: Professional tennis player
David Copperfield: Magician and TV personality
Frank Fertitta III: CEO of Station Casinos
Lorenzo Fertitta: Former CEO of Ultimate Fighting Championship
Russ Freeman (pianist): Bebop jazz pianist and composer
Joey Gallo: MLB player for the New York Yankees
Rick Harrison: Owner of World Famous Gold & Silver Pawn Shop and Pawn Stars Reality TV Star
Penn Jillette: Magician and member of Penn & Teller
Brandon Marshall: Former NFL linebacker for the Denver Broncos and Oakland Raiders
Bob Miller: Former Nevada Governor
Ross Miller: Former Nevada Secretary of State
Michael Morton: Founder of the Morton Group of restaurants
Shabazz Muhammad: NBA player for the Minnesota Timberwolves
DeMarco Murray: Former NFL running back for the Tennessee Titans and Dallas Cowboys
Joey Rickard: MLB player for the San Francisco Giants
Julian Serrano: Michelin-starred celebrity chef
O. J. Simpson: Former NFL player, actor, sportscaster and now parolee from Lovelock Correctional Center
Ronnie Stanley: NFL Offensive Tackle for the Baltimore Ravens
Brendon Urie: Vocalist for Panic! at the Disco
C.J. Watson: NBA basketball player for the Orlando Magic
Dana White: President of Ultimate Fighting Championship
Pia Zadora: Actress and singer 
Stephen Zimmerman: NBA player for the Orlando Magic
Mark Wahlberg: Actor

References

External links

 Summerlin web site

 
1990 establishments in Nevada
Planned communities in Clark County, Nevada
Populated places established in 1990